The 1925 Arizona Wildcats football team was an American football team that represented the University of Arizona as an independent during the 1925 college football season. In its 11th season under head coach Pop McKale, the team compiled a 3–3–1 record and was outscored by a total of 88 to 70. The team captain was Charles H. Gilliland.

Schedule

References

Arizona
Arizona Wildcats football seasons
Arizona Wildcats football